Ammocleonus is a genus of cylindrical weevils belonging to the family Curculionidae.

Species 
 Ammocleonus aschabadensis (Faust, 1884) 
 Ammocleonus hieroglyphicus (Olivier, 1807)

References 

 Biolib
 Zipcodezoo

Lixinae
Curculionidae genera